Raymond Mark Zellars (born March 25, 1973) is a former professional American football fullback in the National Football League (NFL). He played his entire career for the New Orleans Saints (1995–1998).  He played college football at the University of Notre Dame.

1973 births
Living people
Players of American football from Pittsburgh
American football running backs
Notre Dame Fighting Irish football players
New Orleans Saints players